The Adobe Hills are a low mountain range located in Mono County, Eastern California.

See also
Bodie Hills
Bodie, California

References

External links

Mountain ranges of Mono County, California
Mountain ranges of Northern California